Karl Gustaf Alexander Alfthan (17 November 1865 – 3 July 1922) was a Finnish farmer, bank director and politician, born in Hausjärvi. He was a member of the Parliament of Finland in 1922, representing the National Coalition Party.

References

1865 births
1922 deaths
People from Hausjärvi
People from Häme Province (Grand Duchy of Finland)
National Coalition Party politicians
Members of the Parliament of Finland (1922–24)